Ibrahim Abdel Hady Pasha (14 February 1896 – 18 February 1981) was an Egyptian politician who was the 28th Prime Minister from 28 December 1948 until 26 July 1949. He was appointed to the post following the assassination of Prime Minister Mahmoud el Nokrashy Pasha, leader of the Saadist Institutional Party. He was a member of the Saadist Institutional Party. Hady Pasha also served as the Minister of Finance for a short time between 10 December 1946 and 18 February 1947 in the cabinet led by Mahmoud el Nokrashy Pasha. Abdel Majid Badr Pasha succeeded Hady Pasha as finance minister. Hady Pasha was arrested following the end of the King Farouk's rule in 1952 and was sentenced by the Revolutionary Tribunal to death by hanging on 3 October 1953. The sentence was reduced to life imprisonment next day. His personal wealth was also confisticated by the court.

References

External links

1896 births
1981 deaths
20th-century prime ministers of Egypt
Egyptian pashas
Prime Ministers of Egypt
Finance Ministers of Egypt
Egyptian prisoners sentenced to death
Irrigation Ministers of Egypt